No Brakes is the second solo album by John Waite.  It was released in the United States in 1984 on the EMI America label.

It features Waite's biggest hit single "Missing You" which hit #1 on Billboard's Album Rock Tracks and the Billboard Hot 100.  No Brakes was certified Gold in September 1984 - three weeks prior to breaking into the Top 10 of Billboards album chart.

The album's second single, "Tears", charted at #8 on Billboard's Album Rock Tracks chart, and #37 on the  Billboard's Hot 100 chart.

Track listing
 "Saturday Night" (Gary Myrick, John Waite) - 2:46
 "Missing You" (Mark Leonard, Chas Sandford, Waite) - 4:30
 "Dark Side of the Sun" (Jean Beauvoir) - 3:57
 "Restless Heart" (Waite) - 4:27
 "Tears" (Vinnie Cusano, Adam Mitchell) - 3:59
 "Euroshima" (Gary Myrick, Waite) - 5:05
 "Dreamtime/Shake It Up" (Waite, Ivan Král) - 5:10
 "For Your Love" (Waite, Myrick, Donnie Nossov, Curly Smith) - 3:38
 "Love Collision" (Waite, Myrick, Nossov, Smith) - 3:51

Personnel 
 John Waite – lead and backing vocals
 Bruce Brody – keyboards
 Gary Myrick – guitars
 Donnie Nossov – bass, backing vocals
 Curly Smith – drums
 Steve Scales – percussion

Production
 Produced by John Waite, Gary Gersh and David Thoener.
 Engineered and Mixed by David Thoener
 Recording Assistants – John Agnello, Eddie DeLena, David Egerton and Jim Scott.
 Mix Assistant – John Agnello
 Recorded at Record Plant NYC and Record Plant Los Angeles.
 Mastered by George Marino at Sterling Sound (New York, NY).
 Art Direction – Henry Marquez
 Design – Michael Hodgson
 Cover Photo – David Bailey
 Inner Sleeve Photos – Barry Linwell, Jeffrey Scales, Geoffrey Thomas and Mark Weiss.
 Management – Steven Machat and Rick Smith

Charts

Weekly charts

Year-end charts

References 

1984 albums
EMI America Records albums
John Waite albums